Prina may refer to:

 Giuseppe Prina (1766–1814), Italian statesman
 Luca Prina (born 1965), Italian football coach
 Pier Francesco Prina (18th century), Italian artist
 Sonia Prina (born 1975), Italian operatic singer
 Stephen Prina (born 1954), American artist
 Vincenzo Prina (born 1936), Olympic Italian rower
 Prina, Lasithi, a settlement in Lasithi, Crete, Greece
 , a Belgian cargo ship in service 1937-38